The Medicines Act 1968 is an Act of Parliament of the United Kingdom, more properly: An Act to make new provision with respect to medicinal products and related matters, and for purposes connected therewith. It governs the control of medicines for human use and for veterinary use, which includes the manufacture and supply of medicines, and the manufacture and supply of (medicated) animal feeding stuffs.

The Act defines three categories of medicine: prescription only medicines (POM), which are available only from a pharmacist if prescribed by an appropriate practitioner (including, but not limited to doctors, dentists, optometrists, prescribing pharmacists and nurses); pharmacy medicines (P), available only from a pharmacist but without a prescription; and general sales list (GSL) medicines which may be bought from any shop without a prescription.

The Act controls supply of the drugs it covers, but does not define any offence of simple possession.  Possession of a prescription only drug without a prescription is only an offence if the drug is also controlled under the Misuse of Drugs Act 1971 and possession is thus specified as an offence.  Therefore, for example, possession of a prescription only antibiotic without a prescription is not an offence.

For description of the legal classification of medicines in the UK see the Royal Pharmaceutical Society web site, and the publication Medicines Ethics and Practice.

The Act was introduced following problems with the off-label use of thalidomide.

The Act established the forerunner to the actual Commission on Human Medicines.

References

Further reading
The Textbook of Pharmaceutical Medicine, John P. Griffin.

External links

Acts of the Parliament of the United Kingdom concerning healthcare
Pharmacy in the United Kingdom
Pharmaceuticals policy
United Kingdom Acts of Parliament 1968
Veterinary medicine in the United Kingdom
Health law in the United Kingdom